Mohammed Nazimuddin Ahmed (born 1 October 1985) is a Bangladeshi cricketer. A right-handed specialist batsman, he is the captain of Chittagong Division, and has played Test, limited overs and Twenty20 cricket for Bangladesh.

Nazimuddin made his first-class debut at the age of 16. Over the following seasons he was selected to play in the Bangladesh A and Bangladesh Under-19 teans. He played his first senior match for Bangladesh in 2007, in a Twenty20 tournament in Kenya. He was also selected in the Bangladesh national squad tour to Australia in August and September 2008. However, he broke his finger in the warmup to the matches and could not participate. Later in 2008, he was part of a group of Bangladesh players banned from Bangladeshi cricket for ten years for playing in the private Indian Cricket League (ICL). He left the ICL in 2009; the Bangladesh Cricket Board responded by rescinding its ban.

Nazimuddin was recalled to the national team for the two-Test series against Pakistan in December 2011. He made his Test debut in the first match of the series in Chittagong, opening the batting for Bangladesh.

References

External links

1985 births
Living people
Bangladeshi cricketers
Bangladesh Test cricketers
Bangladesh One Day International cricketers
Bangladesh Twenty20 International cricketers
Chittagong Division cricketers
Dhaka Dominators cricketers
Khulna Tigers cricketers
Asian Games medalists in cricket
Cricketers at the 2010 Asian Games
Bangladesh East Zone cricketers
Barisal Division cricketers
Bangladesh under-23 cricketers
Asian Games gold medalists for Bangladesh
Medalists at the 2010 Asian Games
People from Chittagong